Lego Feet (also referred to as SKA001CD or simply Ska001) is the sole self-titled studio album by Lego Feet (a predecessor to British electronic music duo Autechre), released in 1991 by Skam Records. Originally released as a vinyl only, Skam Records re-released the album digitally and on CD with a re-ordered track listing in 2011.

Track listing

References

External links
Bleep.com Page
Discogs Page

1991 EPs
Autechre EPs